The Yonge Street Rapidway is a bus rapid transit corridor on Yonge Street in York Region, Ontario, Canada. Construction of the Yonge Street portion of the network began in 2014. The Rapidway is primarily used by the Viva Blue service.

The Yonge Street Rapidway is central to the Vivanext transport masterplan and will eventually extend from the Richmond Hill/Langstaff Urban Growth Centre at Highway 7 to Green Lane in East Gwillimbury.

In February 2010, a public open house was held for the first segment of the Yonge Street Rapidway, which will extend from Mulock to Davis Drive in Newmarket.

The first segment from the Newmarket Bus Terminal on Davis Drive to Mulock Drive opened in January 2020. The second segment, from 19th Avenue to the Richmond Hill Centre Terminal at Highway 7, opened in December 2020.

The corridor was originally intended to continue south of Richmond Hill Centre Terminal towards the regional bus terminal at  subway station in Toronto. However, with the anticipated northward extension of the Yonge–University subway, the Rapidway's southern terminus will be Richmond Hill Centre.

Stations
Excluding the terminals, there will be up to 19 Rapidway stations between Newmarket and Richmond Hill. Ten stations were open by the end of 2020.

References

Viva Rapid Transit
Bus rapid transit in Canada
The Big Move projects
Busways